Judit Péterfy (born in the 1960s) is a Hungarian former ice dancer. With Csaba Bálint, she is the 1980 World Junior silver medalist and a two-time Hungarian national champion (1982–1983). The duo finished in the top ten at the 1981 European Championships in Innsbruck, Austria; 1982 European Championships in Lyon, France; and 1983 European Championships in Dortmund, West Germany.

Péterfy/Bálint also competed at two World Championships, placing 14th in 1981 (Hartford, Connecticut, United States) and 13th in 1983 (Helsinki, Finland). They were coached by Ilona Berecz.

Competitive highlights 
With Bálint

References 

1960s births
Hungarian female ice dancers
Living people
Figure skaters from Budapest
World Junior Figure Skating Championships medalists
Year of birth uncertain